Fridolin Ambongo Besungu OFMCap (born 24 January 1960) is a Congolese prelate of the Catholic Church. He has been the Archbishop of Kinshasa since his appointment on 1 November 2018. He has been a bishop since 2004 and before becoming Archbishop of Kinshasa was Bishop of Bokungu-Ikela from 2004 to 2016, Apostolic Administrator of Kole from 2008 to 2015, Apostolic Administrator of Mbandaka-Bikoro in 2016 and Archbishop there from 2016 to 2018, Apostolic Administrator of Bokungu-Ikela  from 2016 to 2018, and Coadjutor Archbishop of Kinshasa in 2018. 

He served as a parish priest and as a professor before his episcopal career and since being a bishop has been a leading voice among his conferees for national peace. He is also a professed member of the Order of Friars Minor Capuchin.

Pope Francis raised him to the rank of cardinal on 5 October 2019.

Education and priesthood
Fridolin Ambongo Besungu was born in Boto on 24 January 1960 and prepared for the priesthood by studying philosophy in Bwamanda and theology from 1984 to 1988 at the Saint Eugène de Mazenod Institute. He also entered the Order of Friars Minor Capuchin where he made his initial vows in 1981 and his perpetual profession in 1987. He later obtained a degree in moral theological studies from the Alphonsian Academy in Rome.

Ambongo was ordained to the priesthood on 14 August 1988 following the completion of his education. He worked as a parish priest in Bobito from 1988 until 1989 and then as a professor at the Catholic Faculties of Kinshasa. He taught moral theology at the Mazenod Institute from 1995 to 2005. He also served as both the major superior and the vice-provincial for his order for the vice-province of the Congo.

Bishop
Pope John Paul II appointed him Bishop of Bokungu-Ikela on 22 November 2004. He received his episcopal consecration on 6 March 2005 from Joseph Kumuondala Mbimba with the co-consecrators Giovanni d'Aniello and Cardinal Frédéric Etsou-Nzabi-Bamungwabi in an open-air Mass in front of the Bokungu Cathedral. On 30 October 2008 Pope Benedict XVI named him apostolic administrator for Kole, a post he held until 9 August 2015. He made his first "ad limina" visit to Francis on 12 September 2014.

Archbishop
Pope Francis first named him apostolic administrator for Mbandaka-Bikoro on 5 March 2016 and then Archbishop of that see on 12 November, while retaining responsibility for Bokungu-Ikela as Apostolic Administrator. He was installed in his new see on 11 December 2016.

In 2016–18 he decried the repeated attempts of Congo President Joseph Kabila to push back the election in the Congo believing that it sets an alarming precedent and demonstrates the President's unwillingness to relinquish power. He defended those Catholics who organized pro-democratic demonstrations that drew violent responses from police forces. After these violent clashes he signed a statement on behalf of the bishops stating that the prelates "deplored the attack on human life" while offering their condolences to the families of "innocent victims" killed in the clashes. The statement further called for a "serious and objective investigation" to determine those responsible for the extreme violence. Ambongo opposes Kabila's candidacy for another term as president. Ambongo later led a mission of bishops to Lusaka, Zambia, to meet with Zambian President Edgar Lungu to urge him to support holding peaceful elections in the D.R.C. in December 2018.  In their message to Lungu, the bishops urged support for a "credible, transparent, inclusive and peaceful election" to solve "the socio-political crisis" plaguing the nation. Ambongo also celebrated a Mass in Zambia on 9 September 2018 urging Zambians never to lose peace in their nation.

On 30 May 2018, Ambongo issued a statement in Mbdanka-Bikoro announcing that there would be a suspension of those sacraments that require physical contact to administer due to an outbreak of Ebola in the area. He said that "this is to prevent the spread of Ebola hemorrhagic fever". He also advised giving the sign of peace verbally rather than physically.

Ambongo condemns the exploitation of natural resources and believes that renewables will help alleviate the impact of climate change in the world. In a 4 March 2015 interview in Rome, Ambongu said that "the future is this renewable energy, namely solar panels" in order to reduce climate change, highlighting solar panels as an effort to shift gradually to renewables. He continued that "we, as the Church, are not opposed to the exploration of natural resources", though asserted that such exploration needed to be both legal and transparent. Ambongo also collaborated with Cardinal Christoph Schönborn to secure a meeting between the German and Congo environmental ministers to discuss what the countries could do to improve the quality of the environment in their respective nations.

In March 2015 he reported that he has received death threats: "I am a person in danger in Congo". With a nervous laugh he told a French radio outlet: "I am in danger. This is true".

In June 2016 he was elected Vice-President of the Episcopal Conference of the Congo (CENCO).

On 6 February 2018, Pope Francis appointed Ambongo the coadjutor for the Kinshasa archdiocese, to succeed Cardinal Laurent Monsengwo Pasinya upon his resignation. He was presented to the archdiocese as coadjutor on 11 March 2018. He became Archbishop when Francis accepted Pasinya's resignation on 1 November 2018. He was installed there on 25 November 2018.

On 5 October 2019, Pope Francis made him Cardinal Priest of San Gabriele Arcangelo all'Acqua Traversa. He was made a member of the Congregation for Institutes of Consecrated Life and Societies of Apostolic Life on 21 February 2020. On 15 October 2020, Pope Francis appointed him to the Council of Cardinal Advisers.

In February 2023, Ambongo was elected president of the Symposium of Episcopal Conferences of Africa and Madagascar (SECAM).

See also
Cardinals created by Francis

References

External links

 Catholic Hierarchy 

1960 births
Living people
21st-century Roman Catholic archbishops in Africa
Bishops appointed by Pope John Paul II
21st-century Roman Catholic bishops in the Democratic Republic of the Congo
Democratic Republic of the Congo cardinals
Cardinals created by Pope Francis
Capuchin cardinals
Roman Catholic archbishops of Kinshasa
Roman Catholic bishops of Kinshasa
Roman Catholic bishops of Bokungu–Ikela
Roman Catholic archbishops of Mbandaka-Bikoro